is a live album recorded in 1975 by jazz trumpeter Freddie Hubbard.  It was released as a double LP on CBS/Sony and features a live performance recorded in Tokyo by Hubbard, Carl Randall, George Cables, Henry Franklin, Carl Burnett and Buck Clark. The selections are extended performances of material from Hubbard's recent albums "High Energy" and "Polar AC"; as well as three songs from the upcoming and as of then unrecorded album "Liquid Love". (Sessions for "Liquid Love" began the day after this concert.) In 2012 the album was released as a double cd on the Wounded Bird label.

Track listing 
 "Put It In The Pocket"
 "Ebony Moonbeams"
 "Betcha By Golly Wow"
 "Spirits Of Trane"
 "Kuntu"
 "Midnight At The Oasis" (Nichtern)
 "Too High" (Wonder)
All compositions by Freddie Hubbard except as indicated
Recorded at the Yūbin Chokin Hall, Minato, Tokyo on March 17, 1975

Personnel 
 Freddie Hubbard – trumpet, flugelhorn
 George Cables – electric piano
 Carl Randall – tenor saxophone. flute
 Henry Franklin – Fender bass
 Carl Burnett – drums
 Buck Clarke – congas, percussion

References 

1975 live albums
Freddie Hubbard live albums